Jennia Fredrique Aponte (born Jennia Watson) is an American writer, director and actor known for the films Who Made the Potato Salad?, First Kiss in Color, Sacred Heart (2015) and 90 Days (2017).  The latter, a film about HIV, earned Aponte numerous awards including an African Academy Award.

Biography
Born in Gary, Indiana, Aponte studied film and theater at Columbia College Chicago, before moving to Los Angeles to embark on a career in front of the camera prior to writing and directing.  As an actress, she has held recurring and series regular roles on: Noah’s Arc (Logo), City Guys (NBC), Delores and Jermaine with Whoopi Goldberg (ABC), According to Him & Her (BET), Passions (NBC), My Wife and Kids (ABC), Cuts (CW) and The Hughley's (CW).

In 1999, Aponte starred in the movie Ragdoll with Russell Richardson as the character Teesha.

In 2015, Aponte written and produced with her husband Sol Aponte the short film titled Sacred Heart.

In 2016, Aponte became co-director for the film 90 Days with writer and co-director Nathan Hale Williams. In, 2020 she created and starred in the television movie Anatomy of Black Love with her husband Sol Aponte on Revolt's platform.

In 2017, Aponte created and starred in the film Letter To Heaven.

Aponte has also written and directed, along with her husband and producing partner, Sol Aponte, the Anatomy series, a six-part docuseries for P. Diddy Comb's REVOLT TV.

Her first feature, Diamondback, a redemptive revenge drama set in 1870s Montana produced by June Bug Pictures, is set for a 2021 release.

Works

Film 

 Ragdoll (film) (1999), had the role of Teesha
 Who Made the Potatoe Salad? (2006), had the role of Ashley
 Noah's Arc: Jumping the Broom (2008), had the role of Brandy
 Letter To Heaven (2017), had the role of Ms. Watson (as Jennia Fredrique)
 Revolt’s Anatomy of Black Love (2020), had the role of Herself

Television 

 Cuts (TV series) (2005), as a guest star
 Half & Half (2002-2003), as a guest star
 One on One (TV series) (2002), as a guest star
 City Guys (1999-2001), as a guest star
 The Hughleys (2001), as a guest star
 Girlfriends (2000 TV series) (2001), as a guest star

References

 http://voyagela.com/interview/meet-jennia-fredrique-aponte-full-frequency-media-hollywood/

External links

Jennia Fredrique at Rotten Tomatoes
Jennia Fredrique at TV Guide

Living people
20th-century American actresses
21st-century American actresses
American television actresses
African-American actresses
American film actresses
American women screenwriters
American women film directors
African-American screenwriters
African-American film producers
American film producers
American television producers
American women television producers
African-American film directors
English-language film directors
Year of birth missing (living people)
American women film producers
20th-century African-American women
20th-century African-American people
21st-century African-American women
21st-century African-American people
African-American women writers